Jacques Lemelin (born November 11, 1949) is a Canadian former professional ice hockey goaltender.

During the 1972–73 season, Lemelin played nine games in the World Hockey Association with the Quebec Nordiques.

References

External links

1949 births
Living people
Canadian ice hockey goaltenders
Maine Nordiques players
Quebec Nordiques (WHA) players
Ice hockey people from Quebec City